"Anyway You Want Me" is a country-dance song by the Swedish band Rednex, released on March 7, 2007 via Universal Records, as the third single of their independently released third studio album The Cotton Eye Joe Show.

Track listing
"Anyway You Want Me" (Single Version) - 3:03
"Anyway You Want Me" (Instrumental Version) - 3:01

Charts

2007 singles
Rednex songs
Country ballads
2007 songs